Bharat Kala Bhavan is a university museum located in Banaras Hindu University, Varanasi, India. It has been instrumental in the dissemination of knowledge on Indian art and culture. It is one of the important touristic attractions in the Banaras Hindu University and in the city of Varanasi.

History
The concept for Bharat Kala Bhavan came to fruition with establishment of Bharatiya Lalit Kala Parishad on 1 January 1920 in a wing in Godowlia, Varanasi. Between 1920 and 1962, the museum's collection was shifted to several locations within Varanasi before Jawaharlal Nehru laid foundation of the existing museum building in 1950 and the museum was, then shifted to its existing location in the Banaras Hindu University in 1962.
Mahatma Gandhi visited Bharat Kala Bhavan thrice and in his final trip he inscribed "संग्रह बहुत अच्छा है" ("the collection is very good").

Milestones
1920: Bharatiya Lalit Kala Parishad established.
1926: Bharatiya Lalit Kala Parishad shifted from Godowlia to Central Hindu Boys School at Kamachha.
1929: Rabindra Nath Tagore (first chairman) decided to focus on art and crafts.
1929: Transfer of Bharatiya Lalit Kala Parishad to Kashi Nagari Pracharini Sabha under nomenclature of Bharat Kala Bhavan (Indian Art Museum).
1930: Formal opening of Bharat Kala Bhavan in Kashi Nagari Pracharini Sabha by Prof. Ordhendra Coomar Gangoly
1945: Silver Jubilee.
1947: Lending of exhibits in the exhibitions in London.
1950: Transfer of collection from Nagari Prachrini Sabha to Malaviya Bhavan in Banaras Hindu University.
1950: Foundation of present building laid by Jawaharlal Nehru.
1962: Inauguration of new building by Jawaharlal Nehru.
1970: Golden Jubilee.
1977: Foundation of Western Wing of building laid by Pratap Chandra Chunder.
1980: Passing away of Padma Vibhushan Rai Krishnadasa
1990: Inauguration of Alice Boner gallery.
1995: Platinum Jubilee.
2011: On 150th birth anniversary of Mahamana Pandit Madan Mohan Malaviya, museum produced a documentary film & published a book on him.

Collection
Bharat Kala Bhavan has a collection of artefacts, Buddhist and Hindu sculptures, pictures, manuscripts, Mughal miniatures, paintings, brocade textiles, contemporary art form and bronze statues from 1st–15th century. Pottery, metal craft, ivory goods, jewellery, terracotta beads & rare collection of Gujarati, Rajasthani & Pahari miniature paintings are also on display in the museum.

Items on display
Archival materials
Archaeological materials
Decorative art
Indian philately
Literary
Paintings
Personalia collections
Textiles & costumes

Holdings

See also
 Banaras Hindu University

References

1920 establishments in India
Museums established in 1920
Art museums and galleries in India
Archaeological museums in India
University museums in India
Banaras Hindu University
Buildings and structures in Varanasi
Tourist attractions in Varanasi
Museums in Uttar Pradesh